Zhavehrud Rural District is a rural district (dehestan) in the Central District of Kamyaran County, Kurdistan Province, Iran. At the 2006 census, its population was 12,641, in 3,041 families. The rural district has 30 villages.

References 

Rural Districts of Kurdistan Province
Kamyaran County